

References

1991
Soviet
Films